Stauffenberg is a 2004 Germano–Austrian TV film by Das Erste (German TV ARD), about Claus Schenk Graf von Stauffenberg and the 20 July 1944 plot to assassinate Adolf Hitler. The film was first broadcast on 25 February 2004 on German TV (ARD).

Claus Schenk Graf von Stauffenberg becomes an enemy of Hitler's policy, because Generalmajor Henning von Tresckow informs him about German war crimes behind the Russian front. On 20 July 1944 he goes with a time bomb in his briefcase to a conference room at Hitler's headquarter Wolfsschanze near Rastenburg in East Prussia. Four people were killed immediately, but Hitler survived.
The film was awarded "best film" at the Deutscher Fernsehpreis (German Television Awards).

The film goes by the international English name of Operation Valkyrie.

Cast
Sebastian Koch as Claus von Stauffenberg
Remo Girone as Ludwig Beck

External links 
 
 German language film lexicon

2004 films
2004 television films
Films set in Germany
German television films
2000s German-language films
German-language television shows
Films set in Berlin
German biographical drama films
2004 biographical drama films
Films about capital punishment
Films about the 20 July plot
German war drama films
2000s war films
2004 drama films
Films directed by Jo Baier
2000s German films
Das Erste original programming